Drakesville Township is a township in Davis County, Iowa, USA.  As of the 2000 census, its population was 457.

History
Drakeville Township is named for J. H. Drake, a pioneer settler.

Geography
Drakesville Township covers an area of 12.07 square miles (31.27 square kilometers); of this, 0.01 square miles (0.03 square kilometers) or 0.1 percent is water.

Cities and towns
 Drakesville

Adjacent townships
 Soap Creek Township (north)
 Cleveland Township (southeast)
 Fox River Township (west)
 Marion Township (northwest)

Cemeteries
The township contains one cemetery, Drakesville.

References
 U.S. Board on Geographic Names (GNIS)
 United States Census Bureau cartographic boundary files

External links
 US-Counties.com
 City-Data.com

Townships in Davis County, Iowa
Townships in Iowa